Font-de-Gaume is a cave near Les Eyzies-de-Tayac-Sireuil in the Dordogne départment of south-west France.  The cave contains prehistoric polychrome cave paintings and engravings dating to the Magdalenian period.  Discovered in 1901, more than 200 images have been identified in Font-de-Gaume. Along with other nearby prehistoric archeological sites, Font-de-Gaume was inscribed on the UNESCO World Heritage List in 1979 as the Prehistoric Sites and Decorated Caves of the Vézère Valley.

History
The paintings were discovered by Denis Peyrony, a local schoolmaster, on 12 September 1901.  The cave had been known to the general public before this, but the significance of the paintings had not been recognised.  Four days earlier Peyrony had visited the cave at Les Combarelles, a short distance away, with the archaeologist Henri Breuil, where he saw its prehistoric engravings. The paintings in the cave at Font-de-Gaume were the first to be discovered in the Périgord province.

Prehistoric people living in the Dordogne Valley first settled in the mouth of Font-de-Gaume around 25,000 BC.  The cave mouth was inhabited at least sporadically for the next several thousand years.  However, after the original prehistoric inhabitants left, the cave was forgotten until the nineteenth century when local people again began to visit the cave.  The paintings date from around 17,000 BC, during the Magdalenian period.  Many of the cave's paintings have been discovered in recent decades.  The cave's most famous painting, a frieze of five bison, was discovered accidentally in 1966 while scientists were cleaning the cave.

Present day
As of 2007, Font-de-Gaume was the only site in France with polychrome cave paintings that is still open to the public. 

To date, 230 figures have been recorded in the cave, and it is thought that more are still to be revealed.  Font-de-Gaume holds over 200 polychrome paintings. These engravings are considered the best examples of polychrome painting other than Lascaux, which is now closed to the public. The rock art in Font-de-Gaume includes depictions of more than 80 bison, approximately 40 horses, and more than 20 mammoths.

Notable visitors

In August 1919, the poet T. S. Eliot visited Périgueux. As part of his walking tour, he explored the then already famous Font-de-Gaume cave.

Gallery

See also
 List of Stone Age art
 Art of the Upper Paleolithic

Notes

References

External links

 Fiche technique (PDF) des Monuments Nationaux sur la Grotte de Font de Gaume
 Photo du site du Ministère de la Culture

1901 archaeological discoveries
Show caves in France
Caves containing pictograms in France
Art of the Upper Paleolithic
Tourist attractions in Dordogne
Caves of Dordogne
Archaeological sites in France
Stone Age sites in France
Prehistoric Sites and Decorated Caves of the Vézère Valley